Kang Hui (born November 19, 1991) is a South Korean actor and model. He is known for his lead roles in drama Cherry Blossoms After Winter, Ending Again and Dream Change Laundromat.

Filmography

Film

Television series

Web series

Television shows

Music video appearances

References

External links 
 
 
 
 

1991 births
Living people
21st-century South Korean male actors
South Korean male models
South Korean male television actors
South Korean male film actors